The Rophaien (2,077 m) is a mountain of the Schwyzer Alps, overlooking Lake Lucerne (Urnersee) in the canton of Uri. It lies west of the Rossstock, at the western end of the range north of the Schächental.

References

External links
 Rophaien on Hikr

Mountains of Switzerland
Mountains of the Alps
Mountains of the canton of Uri